Rodeo King and the Senorita is a 1951 American Western film directed by Philip Ford and written by John K. Butler. The film stars Rex Allen, Mary Ellen Kay, Buddy Ebsen, Roy Barcroft, Tristram Coffin and Bonnie DeSimone. The film was released on July 15, 1951, by Republic Pictures.

Plot
Pablo Morales, part-owner of the Foster & Morales Wild West Show, is killed during a stunt on horseback. Steve Lacey plans to replace him in management and in the act, so he is irate at learning Rex Allen is going to be the show's new star.

Pablo's young daughter Juanita takes an immediate liking to Rex and his talented horse, Koko. But when another accident results in a broken leg for Koko that could prove fatal for the horse, Rex and his sidekick Muscles Benton suspect foul play.

Koko recovers thanks to the care of Juanita and her governess, Janet Wells, and Rex feels he should give the horse to the girl. After a fight with Lacey, he intends to leave until he learns that Juanita, now the show's co-owner, has just $2,000 left. After a lab analysis proves the chicanery involved, Foster shoots a sheriff, but Rex manages to make sure the guilty parties  both end up behind bars. A grateful Juanita feels that Koko's rightful place is with Rex.

Cast
Rex Allen as Rex Allen
Koko as Koko
Mary Ellen Kay as Janet Wells
Buddy Ebsen as Muscles Benton
Roy Barcroft as Steve Lacey
Tristram Coffin as Jack Foster
Bonnie DeSimone as Juanita Morales
Don Beddoe as Mr. Richards
Jonathan Hale as Dr. Sands
Harry Harvey, Sr. as Veterinarian
Rory Mallinson as Sheriff Baxter
Joseph Forte as Dr. Teal 
Buff Brady as Pablo Morales

References

External links 
 

1951 films
American Western (genre) films
1951 Western (genre) films
Republic Pictures films
Films directed by Philip Ford
American black-and-white films
1950s English-language films
1950s American films